Roan is a constituency of the National Assembly of Zambia. It covers the Roan suburb of Luanshya and the town of Mapatamatu in Luanshya District of Copperbelt Province.

List of MPs

Election results

2001

2019

References

Constituencies of the National Assembly of Zambia
1962 establishments in Northern Rhodesia
Constituencies established in 1962